Our Tropical Island is a 2001 Italian comedy film  written and directed by Marcello Cesena and starring Diego Abatantuono and Victoria Abril.

Plot

Cast  
 Diego Abatantuono as  Alberto 
 Victoria Abril as Sabina
  Chiara Sani as  Melania 
  Stefano Scandaletti as  Rocco 
 Giulia Steigerwalt as  Sandra 
 Antonio Stornaiolo as  Giacomo 
  Clara Modugno as Mrs.  Ines 
 Enzo Cannavale as  Sciallero 
  Fiammetta Baralla as  Miss Sciallero 
 Nando Gazzolo as  Tacchini 
 Giuliana Calandra as Miss Tacchini 
  Paolo Lombardi as Bormioli 
  Vivian De La Cruz as  Mai Van 
  Valerio Capitolino as  Carlo
 Barbara Bouchet as TV Presenter
  Enzo Iacchetti as  Meteorologist
  Giulio Golia as  Waiter
  Lucia Ocone as Cashier
  Isa Gallinelli as  Cashier

See also  
 List of Italian films of 2001

References

External links

2001 comedy films
2001 films
Italian comedy films